Ross, Skye and Lochaber, may refer to:

 Ross, Skye and Lochaber (UK Parliament constituency), a Scottish constituency of the House of Commons of the Parliament of the United Kingdom
 Ross, Skye and Lochaber, one of three corporate management areas of the Highland Council, Scotland, created in 2007